Craig L. Thrasher (born December 16, 1970, in Chardon, Ohio) is an American former alpine skier who competed in the 1994 Winter Olympics, finishing 38th in the downhill race. He currently has a wife named Cathryn and three children.

References

1970 births
Living people
American male alpine skiers
Olympic alpine skiers of the United States
Alpine skiers at the 1994 Winter Olympics
People from Chardon, Ohio